Hormipam Ruivah (born 25 January 2001) is an Indian professional footballer who plays as a centre-back for Indian Super League club Kerala Blasters and the India national team.

Club career

Youth and early career
Hormipam hails from Somdal Village in the Ukhrul District of Manipur and has been playing football since his early childhood. He joined the SAI academy in 2017 and spend more than a year at the academy. In 2018, Hormipam joined Minerva Punjab FC and went on to establish himself as a regular for their youth team. He was central to the dominant Minerva Punjab side that won their maiden Hero Elite League (U-18) title in the 2018–19 season.
 
Hormipam joined Indian Arrows on loan from Punjab FC in November 2019 and made his professional debut for the side in their first match of the season against Gokulam Kerala. He started and played the entire match as Indian Arrows lost 0–1. Hormipam played 14 matches for the Arrows during the 2019–20 I-League. He returned to Punjab FC for the 2020–21 I-League after the end of his loan spell at Arrows.

Kerala Blasters
On 8 April 2021, Hormipam joined Indian Super League club Kerala Blasters FC on a three-year deal which keep him upto 2024. He made his debut for the club on 11 September 2021 against Indian Navy in the Durand Cup, by coming in as a substitute for Abdul Hakku, who suffered an injury during the match. He played his next Durand Cup match against Bengaluru on 15 September, where he received a red card and the Blasters lost match 2–0 against the arch-rivals. Hormipam made his ISL debut with the club on 19 December 2021 against the defending champions Mumbai City FC in a 3–0 victory. He made seven clearances, five interceptions, five tackles and won every ground duel he participated in the match against Mumbai City and was appreciated by the media for his performance in his ISL debut. In the match against Jamshedpur FC on 10 February 2022, Hormipam was met with a head-clash with the goalkeeper, and was stretched-out of the game. Two days later, the Blasters gave a statement on his injury, where it was confirmed that he has sustained a nasal bone fracture and has undergone a surgery. On 26 February, he came back to the pitch in the derby match against Chennaiyin FC, which they won 3–0. Hormipam eventually formed a formidable and successful partnership with Marko Lešković and emerged as one of the best centre back pairs in the league. His performance for the Blasters' 0–1 victory against Jamshedpur on 11 March in the first leg of the semi-final earned him the man of the match award. He was then awarded with ISL's 'Emerging Player of the Month' award for his performance in the month of March, and was also voted as the 'Hero of the Month' by the fans and experts for the same month.

International career
After a fine season with Minerva Punjab, Hormipam was called up by the Indian U-18 side. He was part of the Indian team that won the 2019 SAFF U-18 Championship held at Nepal.

In 2021, Ruivah was included in the final squad of the India U-23 team that participated in the 2022 AFC U-23 Asian Cup qualification.

In March 2022, Ruivah was called up for the national squad by coach Igor Štimac ahead of India's two friendly matches against Bahrain and Belarus. He made his debut against Belarus on 26 March.

Career statistics

Club

Honours 
Minerva Punjab
 Elite League: 2018–19 

Kerala Blasters
 Indian Super League runner-up: 2021–22

India U18
 SAFF U-18 Championship: 2019

Individual
 Indian Super League Hero of the Month: March 2022

References

2001 births
Living people
Indian footballers
Indian Arrows players
People from Ukhrul district
Footballers from Manipur
India international footballers
I-League players
India youth international footballers
Association football midfielders
Kerala Blasters FC players
Indian Super League players
RoundGlass Punjab FC players
Naga people